Yongtai station, formerly Yongtai East station during planning, is a metro station on Line 3 on the Guangzhou Metro. The underground station is located at the north of Huanan Expressway and Tongtai Road in the Baiyun District and started operation on 30October 2010.

References

Railway stations in China opened in 2010
Guangzhou Metro stations in Baiyun District